Faridabad is the most populous city in the Indian state of Haryana and a part of Delhi National Capital Region. It is one of the major satellite cities around Delhi and is located 284 kilometres south of the state capital Chandigarh. The river Yamuna forms the eastern district boundary with Uttar Pradesh. The Government of India included it in the second list of Smart Cities Mission on 24 May 2016. Faridabad has been described as the eighth fastest growing city in the world and the third in India by the City Mayors Foundation survey. As per the 2001 Delhi Regional Plan, Faridabad is part of the Delhi Metropolitan Area (DMA).

The newly developed residential and industrial part of Faridabad (Sec. 66 to 89) between the Agra Canal and the Yamuna River is commonly referred to as Greater Faridabad. The area is being developed as a self-sustained sub-city with wide roads, tall buildings, malls, educational institutions, and health and commercial centers. Sectors 66 to 74 are Industrial Sectors, while Sectors 75 to 89 are Residential Sectors.

Faridabad is a major industrial hub of Haryana. 50% of the income tax collected in Haryana is from Faridabad and Gurgaon. Faridabad is famous for henna production from the agricultural sector, while tractors, motorcycles, switch gears, refrigerators, shoes, tyres and garments constitute its primary industrial products.

In 2018, Faridabad was considered by the World Health Organization as the world's second most polluted city. In 2020, Faridabad ranked 10th in the Swachh Survekshan Survey's top ten dirtiest cities in India in 2020.

Faridabad has been selected as one of the hundred Indian cities to be developed as a smart city under Government of India's flagship Smart Cities Mission by Ministry of Urban Development.

History 
The city was founded in 1607 by Sheikh Farīd, treasurer to the Mughal emperor Jahangir, to protect the Grand Trunk Road between Delhi and Agra, and lies in the cultural region of Braj. A project for Pakistani refugee resettlement and light industrial development was initiated in the city in 1950. In Independent India, Faridabad was initially a part of Gurgaon district which was later made an independent district on 15 August 1979.

Nearby Tilpat (then "Tilprastha") was one of the five villages demanded by Pandavas to avert a disastrous war.

Geography

Climate 

Faridabad has a borderline hot semi-arid climate (Köppen BSh) just short of a dry-winter humid subtropical climate (Cwa). The city features the three typical Indian seasons - The "hot" or pre-monsoon season lasts from late March to late June and is typified by sweltering and arid conditions that begin very dry but latterly turn humid. The "wet" or monsoon season is sweltering and often dangerously humid with frequent but erratic heavy rainfall. Following the retreat of the monsoon is the "cool" or winter season with warm and sunny weather producing by far the most comfortable conditions.

Demographics 

As per 2011 census, Faridabad had a population of 1,414,050 out of which there were 754,542 males and 659,508 females. The literacy rate was 83.83 per cent.
The local languages are Brajbhasha and Haryanvi.

Administration 
There are six key administrators of Faridabad.

Faridabad, Palwal, and Nuh district jointly fall under Faridabad division of Haryana. A Division is headed by a Divisional Commissioner.

Faridabad has a judiciary system headquartered at District Court in Sector 12 which came into existence on 8 December 1980 with Shri A.P. Chaudhary as first District & Sessions Judge, Faridabad. The District Court has its Bar association with more than 2000 lawyers as its members

Economy 
The Faridabad Small Industries Association claims that Faridabad and Gurgaon districts account for almost 56% of the income tax collected in Haryana. Faridabad has been selected as one of the hundred Indian cities to be developed as a smart city under PM Narendra Modi's flagship Smart Cities Mission. It has started growing as another technology hub in Haryana nurturing startups and innovation.

Faridabad is the largest exporter of henna (Mehandi) in India. According to the Faridabad Henna Manufacturing Association, the sale of henna from Faridabad is worth an estimated – annually.

Many directorates of different union government ministries are headquartered in Faridabad including Central Ground Water Board, Department of Plant Quarantine and Central Insecticide Lab, and Union Government Offices from Haryana including the Commissioner of Central Excise within Department of Revenue, Government of India, Department of Explosives, and Department of Labour. Institute such as National Council for Cement and Building Materials, a research and development institute under the ministry of commerce, and industry has its head office in Faridabad.

The Apex Central Training Institute of the Department of Revenue, Government of India, National Academy of Customs Excise & Narcotics is located at Sector 29. The National Power Training Institute, an autonomous body under Ministry of Power, Government of India has a corporate office in Faridabad. The city also hosts the National Institute of Financial Management, which serves as training academy for accounting and financial services.

Also headquartered here is NHPC Limited
which is a Central PSU under the Ministry of Power, Government of India, and the largest Hydro-power Company in India.

An office of Geological Survey of India is also located in the NIT-5 area of the city.

Faridabad is the industrial capital of Haryana. As of 2013, out of a total of 11,665 registered working factories in Haryana, 2,499 were in Faridabad which was followed by Gurgaon with 2,116 factories. According to a study, the growth of Faridabad has been declining in the last 2 decades, the share of Faridabad in investment is less than 1% and 93% of investment is in the paper industry. The industrial contribution of Faridabad to Haryana's revenue was declined from 29% to 22% in 2012–13.

Faridabad is home to large-scale companies like Escorts Limited, India Yamaha Motor Pvt. Ltd., Havells India Limited, JCB India Limited, Indian Oil (R&D), Larsen & Toubro (L&T), Whirlpool India Ltd., ABB Group, Goodyear India Ltd., Bata India Ltd and Eicher Tractor Ltd. and Beebay Kidswear Eyewear e-tailer Lenskart and healthcare startup Lybrate have their headquarters in Faridabad. More than 5,000 units of auto parts producers are based in Faridabad. Lakhani Armaan Group has set up manufacturing facilities at Faridabad (Haryana).

Transportation and connectivity

Rail
Faridabad is on the broad gauge of the New Delhi – Mumbai Line. New Delhi and Hazrat Nizammudin Railway Station is about 25 km away from Old Faridabad railway station. The trains for big cities like Mumbai, Hyderabad, Chennai are easily accessible from here. Local trains runs between New Delhi to Faridabad.

Metro

Delhi Metro Violet Line connects Faridabad with Delhi. The extension of Violet Line to Faridabad was inaugurated by Prime Minister Narendra Modi on 6 Sepetmeber 2015. There are 9 metro stations in Faridabad corridor of Delhi Metro which are all elevated. Metro has been recently elongated to Ballabhgarh with the addition of two stations- Sant Surdas Sihi and Raja Nahar Singh Ballabhgarh.

The 11 metro stations are Sarai, NHPC Chowk, Mewala Maharajpur, Sector 28, Badkhal Mor, Old Faridabad, Neelam Chowk Ajronda, Bata Chowk, Escorts Mujesar, Sant Surdas (Sihi) and Raja Nahar Singh.

Road

Faridabad is well connected with Delhi through Delhi Faridabad Skyway (Badarpur Flyover).
It is also connected to cities of Gurugram through Faridabad Gurugram Road (SH137) and Gautam Buddha Nagar of Uttar Pradesh.

Airways
Faridabad is served by Indira Gandhi International Airport in New Delhi, which is around 35 km from Faridabad. The airport is the busiest airport in India and provides domestic and international air connectivity.

Education

Higher education
There are numerous educational institutions in Faridabad that offer higher education courses. These colleges provide courses in different field like science, medicine, arts, commerce, engineering, MCA, etc. Some of the colleges that offer graduate and undergraduate courses include:

 Al-Falah University (AFU)
 ESIC Medical College
 Institute of Hotel Management, Faridabad
 J.C. Bose University of Science and Technology, YMCA
 Lingaya's University
 Manav Rachna International University
 National Power Training Institute
 Regional Centre for Biotechnology (RCB)
 Translational Health Science and Technology Institute (THSTI)

Healthcare

There are many private and government hospitals in Faridabad. The city also has one Government Medical College Hospital named
Employees State Insurance Corporation Medical College, Faridabad. The city had another private medical college Gold field medical college situated in Village Chainsa, Ballabgarh which got defunct in 2016 due to financial constraints and later bought by Haryana government and planned to restart in 2020 by the name of "Atal Bihari Vajpayee government medical College". Other hospitals include:

 Amrita Hospital
 Asian Institute of Medical Sciences
 ESIC Medical College
 Metro Heart Institute Hospital

 Accord Hospital
 Asian Fidelis Multi Speciality Hospital
 Badshah Khan Hospital popularly known as BK Hospital
 Fortis Escorts Hospital
 IBS Ashwani Hospital
 Park Hospital, Faridabad
 QRG Health City
 RG Stone Urology & Laparoscopy Hospital
 Sarvodaya Hospital & Research Centre
 SSB Heart And Multispecialty Hospital

Sports

Cricket

The Nahar Singh Stadium, which has approximately 25,000 seats, has hosted 8 international cricket matches and a league cricket match between Mumbai Heroes and Bhojpuri Dabbang of Celebrity Cricket League. However, owing to the poor condition of the grounds, international competitions have not been held there since 2017. In 2019, a $10.15 million (115 Crore) Haryana government project began to renovate the stadium and grounds. International matches are expected to resume in the facility by the early 2020.

Tourism

Badkhal Lake 

Badkhal Lake was located in Badkhal village, 8 km from Delhi Border. The lake fringed by Aravalli hills was a man-made embankment which has now dried up. The lake complex, spread over 40 acres, had come up in 1969. In June 2015, Haryana government decided to revive the Badkhal lake here to once again attract tourists.

Surajkund Tourist Complex and International Crafts Fair 

Situated at a distance of around 8 km from South Delhi. It is a 10th-century water reservoir which believed to be built by Tomar king Surajpal. Place is known for its annual fair "Surajkund International Crafts Mela". 2015 edition of fair was visited by 1.2 million visitors including 160,000 foreigners with more than 20 countries participating in fair. The Suraj Kund Lake. D2i.in. Retrieved on 2012-01-10. here is surrounded by rock cut steps.

2016 edition of Surajkund International Crafts Mela was the 30th edition and People's Republic of China will be participating in the fair. Participation of the China will be the part of agreement signed between India and China in 2014 to celebrate year 2016 as "Year of China in India".

In 2021, the international crafts fair or Surajkund Mela, as it commonly called scheduled from 1 to 15 February was cancelled for the first time in 34 years amid COVID-19 fears.

Anangpur Dam

This unique Indian hydraulic engineering structure was built during the reign of King Anangpal of the Tomar dynasty in the 8th century. It is approachable by road from Delhi from the Delhi – Mathura road. The ruins of the fortifications found in Anangpur village establish by an inference that it was built by Anangpal as part of the Lal Kot that was developed as the first city of Delhi in the 8th century.

Raja Nahar Singh Palace 

Raja Nahar Singh palace is located in Ballabhgarh. Now Haryana Tourism manages the palace as heritage property.It is owned by the tewatia family, the inheritors. The palace is now a motel-cum-restaurant.

Baba Farid's Tomb 
The tomb is located in old Faridabad. Baba Farid was a popular Sufi Sant. The tomb contains 2 gigantic doors and the graves of Baba Farid and his son.

Prehistoric stone age site 

Archaeologists discovered cave paintings and tools from the Paleolithic period in the Mangar Bani hill forest, which is on the outskirts of Faridabad. The cave paintings are estimated to be one lac years old. These are believed to be the largest in the Indian subcontinent and possibly the world's oldest.

Recreation 
Faridabad and various shopping malls including SRS Mall in Sector 12, Crown Interiors Mall in Sector 37, Crown Plaza in Sector 15 A, Parasnath Mall along with several others. The city has a good network of parks in each sector with some of the major parks like Town Park in Sector 12 which also accommodates one of the Largest Flag of India. Omaxe World Street is the recent addition to the malls of Greater faridabad.

Religious sites

 ISKCON Faridabad Sri Sri Rādhā Govind Dhām.
 Shri Maharani Vaishno Devi Mandir, Tikona Park. 
 Shri Salasar Balaji Evam Khatu Shyam Mandir, Main Mathura Road, Ballabhgarh
 Shri 1008 Parshvanath Digambar Jain Mandir, Sector 16
 Jharna Mandir, Mohabbtabad
 Nagashri Temple, Sihi
 Ratan Nath Mandir
 Shiv Mandir, Sainik Colony
 Shri Triveni Hanuman Mandir at Gurgaon-Faridabad Expressway
 Parson Temple near Badhkal Lake
 Jagannath Temple, Sector 15A
 Hari Parwat Mandir, Anangpur

Utilities
Faridabad has been selected as one of the 100 Smart Cities in India. A live talk show on making Faridabad 'a smart city' was organised at Municipal Corporation's Auditorium. Haryana Power Generation Corporation Ltd (HPGCL) is setting up a solar power plant at the site of a defunct thermal power plant in Faridabad. The power generator plans to set up the plant over 151.78 acres near Bata Chowk in the district that generated coal based energy in the past.

Environment
A petition was filed with National Green Tribunal (NGT) for protection of Aravalli from Faridabad waste disposal.

Politics of Faridabad 
The Lok Sabha MP from Faridabad is Krishan Pal Gurjar, who was elected in May 2019. The MLA is Narender Gupta, who was elected in October 2019.

Notable people 

 Ram Chander Bainda – politician
 Avtar Singh Bhadana, politician
 Rahul Dalal, b 1992 – cricketer.
 Krishan Pal Gurjar, politician
 Himani Kapoor, b 1988 – singer
 Ajey Nagar – YouTube content creator under the name CarryMinati
 Lalit Nagar - politician - MLA from Tigaon constituency
 Nikhil Nanda – industrialist
 Sonu Nigam, b 1973 – playback singer
 Dhruv Rathee - YouTuber
 Ajay Ratra, b 1981 – former international cricketer
 Mahesh Rawat, b 1985 – cricketer
 Anisa Sayyed – shooter
 Richa Sharma, b 1980 – playback and devotional singer
 Mahender Pratap Singh – Indian politician
 Rahul Tewatia – cricketer - Haryana - Gujarat Titans

See also
 Gurgaon
 Noida

References

Sources

External links 
 District Faridabad Official Web Site
 Municipal Corporation of Faridabad Official Website
 
 

 
Smart cities in India
Metropolitan cities in India
Faridabad district
Cities and towns in Faridabad district
Landforms of Haryana
Archaeological sites in Haryana
Tourist attractions in Haryana
Rebuilt buildings and structures in India
Satellite cities
Satellite Cities in India